The Victoria Buildings is an historic row of buildings in Perth, Scotland. Designed by local architect Andrew Heiton, the building is Category B listed,  dating to 1872. Standing on Tay Street, immediately south of St Matthew's Church, the building was the "birthplace" of General Accident Fire & Life Assurance Corporation.

Architect David Smart had his offices at number 42.

See also
List of listed buildings in Perth, Scotland

References

1872 establishments in Scotland
Victoria Buildings
Category B listed buildings in Perth and Kinross